Savoy is a historical country in western Europe, heart of the Savoyard state.

Savoy or The Savoy may also refer to:

Places 
 County of Savoy, a Middle Ages county near where modern Switzerland, Italy and France meet
 Duchy of Savoy, a duchy in the Italian peninsula during the Middle Ages
 Liberty of the Savoy, in London, England
 Precinct of the Savoy
 Savoy, a zone of Sliema, Malta
 Savoy Estate, a suburb of Johannesburg, South Africa
 Savoy, Arkansas, U.S.
 Savoy, Illinois, U.S.
 Savoy, Massachusetts, U.S.
 Savoy, Texas, U.S.
 Savoy, Wisconsin, U.S., a ghost town

Buildings

Cinemas and theatres
 Savoy Theatre, in Glace Bay, Canada
 , Helsinki, Finland
 Savoy Cinema, Dublin, Ireland
 Savoy Cinema, Colombo, Sri Lanka
 Safari Cinema or the Savoy in Croydon, UK
 Savoy Theatre, London, UK
 Savoy Theatre, Monmouth, UK
 Kettering Savoy, Kettering, UK
 Savoy Theatre/Cinema, now The Deco, Northampton, UK
 Savoy Theatre (New York City), US

Hotels
 Savoy Hotel, London, UK
 Savoy Hotel, Copenhagen, Denmark
 Savoy Hotel, Moscow, Russia
 Savoy Hotel, Mussoorie, Uttarakhand, India
 Savoy Hotel, Perth, Australia
 Savoy Hotel and Grill, Kansas City, Missouri
 Savoy Homann Bidakara Hotel, Bandung, Indonesia
 Brighton Savoy Hotel, Brighton, Australia
 Savoy Baur en Ville, Zürich, Switzerland

Other buildings
 Savoy Ballroom, Harlem, Manhattan, New York City, US
 Savoy Ballroom (Chicago), Chicago, Illinois, US
 Savoy Chapel, London, UK
 Savoy Palace, London, UK
 Savoy Pier, London, UK
 The Savoy (Indianapolis, Indiana), US

Music 
 Savoy (Norwegian band), a Norwegian-American rock trio
 Savoy (album), 2004
 Savoy (American band)
 Savoy opera, a style of comic opera
 Savoy Records, an American jazz record label
 Savoy Family Band, a Louisiana Cajun band
 "Savoy Truffle", a song by The Beatles

Literature 
 Hotel Savoy (novel), a novel by Joseph Roth
 The Savoy (periodical), an 1896 London literary magazine

Other uses
 Savoy cabbage, a type of cabbage which has curly leaves
 Savoy Operation, a 1975 PLO terrorist attack at the Savoy Hotel, Tel-Aviv, Israel
 Savoy Pictures, a motion picture company
 House of Savoy, the last royal dynasty of Italy
 Operation Savoy, a 2002 ICAC investigation about thefts at the Australian Museum
 Plymouth Savoy, an American automobile
 Infantry Regiment "Saboya" No. 6 or Regiment of Savoy No. 6, a mechanized infantry unit in the Spanish Army
 Savoy crackers, made by Arnott's Biscuits Holdings
 Savoy wine, a designated AOC in France
 Savoy (restaurant), a restaurant in Helsinki, Finland
 The Savoy, a 2020 British television series filmed within the Savoy Hotel, London

People with the surname
 Andy Savoy (born 1963), Canadian politician and engineer
 Ann Savoy (born 1952), American musician, author, and record producer
 Brian Savoy (born 1992), Swiss basketball player
 Gene Savoy (1927–2007), American author and explorer
 Joel Savoy, Louisiana musician
 Marc Savoy (born 1940), Cajun accordionist and accordion maker
 Suzanne Savoy, American actress 
 Teresa Ann Savoy (1955–2017), British-born actress
 Wilson Savoy (born 1982), American musician and singer

See also
 Sovay, a folk song in which a woman puts her "true love" to a test
 Savoie (disambiguation)
 Savoyard (disambiguation)